Kathleen Ferguson (born Tamnaherin, County Londonderry in 1958) is an Irish author known for The Maid's Tale which won the 1995 Irish Times Literature Prize for fiction. Educated at the University of Ulster at Coleraine. It was praised by the London Independent for its "wonderful candour" and the "lovely Derry idiom".

Kathleen Ferguson is married and lives in Rome, Italy.

Published works

References

1958 births
Alumni of Ulster University
Women novelists from Northern Ireland
Living people
Date of birth missing (living people)
20th-century novelists from Northern Ireland
20th-century writers from Northern Ireland
21st-century writers from Northern Ireland
20th-century women writers from Northern Ireland
21st-century women writers from Northern Ireland